The 2017 Canada Open Grand Prix, was the ninth Grand Prix's badminton tournament of the 2017 BWF Grand Prix Gold and Grand Prix. The tournament was held at the Markin MacPhail Centre in Calgary, Alberta, Canada on 11 – 16 July 2017 and had a total purse of $65,000.

Men's singles

Seeds

 Lee Hyun-il (semifinals)
 H. S. Prannoy (third round)
 Sameer Verma (withdrew)
 Zulfadli Zulkiffli (withdrew)
 Pablo Abián (quarterfinals)
 Kanta Tsuneyama (champion)
 Ygor Coelho (quarterfinals)
 Kazumasa Sakai (first round)
 Jeon Hyeok-jin (quarterfinals)
 Henri Hurskainen (withdrew)
 Lucas Corvee (third round)
 Mark Caljouw (third round)
 Nguyen Tien Minh (first round)
 Lucas Claerbout (first round)
 Niluka Karunaratne (third round)
 Parupalli Kashyap (second round)

Finals

Top half

Section 1

Section 2

Section 3

Section 4

Bottom half

Section 5

Section 6

Section 7

Section 8

Women's singles

Seeds

 Beiwen Zhang (second round)
 Aya Ohori (quarterfinals)
 Beatriz Corrales (second round)
 Linda Zetchiri (first round)
 Natalia Koch Rohde (second round)
 Vu Thi Trang (first round)
 Lee Jang-mi (first round)
 Michelle Li (first round)

Finals

Top half

Section 1

Section 2

Bottom half

Section 3

Section 4

Men's doubles

Seeds

 Lu Ching-yao / Yang Po-han (semifinals)
 Takuto Inoue / Yuki Kaneko (quarterfinals)
 Manu Attri / B. Sumeeth Reddy (quarterfinals)
 Richard Eidestedt / Nico Ruponen (second round)
 Matthew Chau / Sawan Serasinghe (first round)
 Hiroki Okamura / Masayuki Onodera (first round)
 Joshua Magee / Sam Magee (first round)
 Peter Briggs / Tom Wolfenden (champion)

Finals

Top half

Section 1

Section 2

Bottom half

Section 3

Section 4

Women's doubles

Seeds

 Gabriela Stoeva / Stefani Stoeva (second round)
 Setyana Mapasa / Gronya Somerville (withdrew)
 Anastasia Chervyakova / Olga Morozova (quarterfinals)
 Kim Hye-rin / Yoo Hae-won (quarterfinals)
 Chae Yoo-jung / Kim So-yeong (semifinals)
 Mayu Matsumoto / Wakana Nagahara (champion)
 Eefje Muskens / Selena Piek (withdrew)
 Meghana Jakkampudi / Poorvisha S Ram (first round)

Finals

Top half

Section 1

Section 2

Bottom half

Section 3

Section 4

Mixed doubles

Seeds

 Choi Sol-gyu / Chae Yoo-jung (final)
 Pranaav Jerry Chopra / N. Sikki Reddy (quarterfinals)
 Nico Ruponen / Amanda Hogstrom (quarterfinals)
 Sam Magee / Chloe Magee (second round)
 Ronan Labar / Audrey Fontaine (second round)
 Sawan Serasinghe / Setyana Mapasa (second round)
 Jacco Arends / Selena Piek (quarterfinals)
 Nyl Yakura / Brittney Tam (first round)

Finals

Top half

Section 1

Section 2

Bottom half

Section 3

Section 4

References

External links
 Official site
 Tournament Link

 

Canadian Open (badminton)
BWF Grand Prix Gold and Grand Prix
Canada Open
Canada Open
Sport in Calgary